Enejit Airport is a public use airstrip at Enejit on Mili Atoll, Marshall Islands.

Airlines and destinations

References

Airports in the Marshall Islands